Abu Uways Muhammad Abu Khubza al-Hassani (July 30, 1932 – January 30, 2020) was a Moroccan Muslim theologian, jurist, bibliographer and linguist. His name has variantly been spelled "Bukhabza," "Boukhabza," Bu Khabza," and "Bu Khubza."

Life
Abu Khubza was born on the 26th of Rabi' al-awwal in the year 1351 according to the Islamic calendar, corresponding to the 30th of July in 1932 Gregorian.

Works
Abu Khubza produced a detailed library catalog for the Tétouan branch of the Bibliothèque Générale et Archives, Morocco's national library.

Original works
 Fihris makhtutat khizana titwan. Tétouan: 1984. 2 vols. With al-Mahdi al-Daliru.

Edited works
 Ibn al-Arabi, Siraj al-muhtadin fi adab al-salihin. Tétouan: Manshurat Jam'iyyat al-Ba'th al-Islami, 1992.
 Tirmidhi, Aridat al-ahwadhi bi sharh sahih al-Tirmidhi. Beirut: Dar al-Kutub al-'Ilmiyya, 1997. 8 vols.

Citations

1932 births
2020 deaths
People from Tétouan
Moroccan imams
Moroccan Sunni Muslim scholars of Islam
Moroccan male poets
20th-century Moroccan poets
Bibliographers
Hadith scholars
Jurisprudence academics
Moroccan biographers
20th-century Moroccan historians
20th-century Muslim scholars of Islam
Hasanids
Sunni fiqh scholars
Sunni Muslim scholars of Islam
Sunni imams
20th-century imams
Linguists from Morocco
Moroccan theologians
Moroccan Salafis
21st-century Moroccan poets